Maquela do Zombo is a town, with a population of 42,000 (2014 census), and a  municipality, with a population of 127,351 (2014 census), in Uíge Province in Angola.

References

Populated places in Uíge Province
Municipalities of Angola